Hilton Edward Booker (November 5, 1917 – January 26, 1975) was an American boxer who was active during the 1930s and 1940s.

Booker was one of the famous "Murderers Row" group of black boxers, along with the likes of Charley Burley, Holman Williams and Jack Chase, avoided by other elite fighters of the era because of their ability and their skin colour. Booker compiled a record of 66-5-8, which included a (1-1-1) record vs. Holman Williams, (0-1) record vs. Jack Chase, (1-0) vs. Lloyd Marshall, (0-1) Cocoa Kid. Other Notable Booker fights include a (1-0-2) record vs. Archie Moore (being the first to knock him out) a win over Harry Matthews, a loss to Fritzie Zivic and a (2-1-1) record vs Shorty Hogue. Like all black murderer's row fighters, he never got an opportunity to fight for a world title. Booker was forced to retire prematurely due to an eye injury. He was a 2017 inductee of the International Boxing Hall of Fame.

World Champion Archie Moore thought the world of Booker saying, “I’ve had some rough fights in my time,” Moore said, “but all things being equal, when I was in my prime, one of my toughest had to have been against Eddie Booker, a fighting machine … who shot out punches with deft precision … [Booker] was one of the great fighters of my time. He had me fighting for dear life.”

Booker was blind later in life due to eye injuries suffered from an illegally doctored glove. He died in San Francisco on January 26, 1975 at 57 years old.

Professional boxing record

See also
 Murderers' Row (Boxing)

References

External links
 

1917 births
1975 deaths
African-American boxers
Boxers from Texas
Welterweight boxers
Middleweight boxers
American male boxers
20th-century African-American sportspeople
International Boxing Hall of Fame inductees